No Name on the Bullet is a 1959 American CinemaScope Western film directed by Jack Arnold, and starring Audie Murphy, Charles Drake, and Joan Evans. It is one of a handful of pictures in that genre directed by Arnold, better known for his science-fiction movies of the era. Although it is one of Universal Pictures' modestly budgeted vehicles for World War II hero Audie Murphy, the top-billed actor is unusually, but very effectively, cast as the villain, a cold-blooded gun-for-hire.

Plot
When infamous hired gunman John Gant (Audie Murphy) arrives in the small town of Lordsburg, Arizona, the locals are terrified by his reputation and surprised by how young he is. Although Sheriff Buck Hastings would like to arrest Gant, he points out to the townsmen that Gant always coerces his rivals to draw their gun first, allowing him to kill them legally in "self-defense."  While the men in the town speculate anxiously about Gant's target, Luke Canfield (played by Charles Drake, an off-screen friend and frequent co-star with Murphy), the town blacksmith and doctor, greets Gant and is totally unaware of Gant's reputation as a hired gunman. During his first meeting with Gant at the smithy, Luke demonstrates his perfect aim with a maul.

Luke proudly takes Gant on a tour through town and agrees to join him later for a game of chess. At home, Luke's fiancée, Anne Benson, tends to her father, Judge Benson, who suffers from consumption. Luke's father Asa joins them for dinner, during which Buck arrives to warn Luke to stay away from Gant. Asa cautions Buck not to condemn Gant prematurely, but Buck is reluctant to accept his advice and reveals that he feels he will be powerless against Gant's superior gun skills. Later, mine owners Earl Stricker and Thad Pierce assume that their partner, Ben Chaffee, has hired Gant to kill them to take sole ownership of the mine. When they find Gant in the saloon and propose a counter-offer, however, Gant observes that no innocent man would be afraid, and turns them away.

Upon hearing that Stricker and Pierce were seen talking with Gant, Chaffee assumes that they want to kill him. He questions Luke about Gant, and after Luke fails to calm him, the physician walks through town, noting that the townsmen are all hiding behind guns and locked doors. While clerk Lou Fraden and his wife Roseanne discuss their certainty that her ex-husband has sent Gant to kill them, Luke confronts Gant, asking him why he has come. Impressed with Luke's bravery and integrity, Gant explains that he believes that Luke, who saves the lives of men "who deserve to die," is less ethical than him. While they talk, a panicked Pierce shoots himself in his office and dies later that night. After this, Luke accuses Gant of murder. When Buck tries to throw Gant out of town, Gant refuses to leave. When the sheriff pulls a gun on Gant, Gant shoots him in the hand and renders him useless. When asked why Gant did not kill him, the gunman explains it was because no one was paying him.

Later, Judge Benson advocates using vigilante law to throw out Gant, but after Luke protests, suggests sacrificing the one man Gant is after to save the rest of the town. Meanwhile, Fraden, emboldened by alcohol, confronts Gant, who calmly encourages him to draw his gun. At Luke's urging, Fraden flees, leaving Luke to demand fruitlessly that Gant leave town. Next, Stricker gathers the townsmen to challenge Gant, and although Luke disapproves, he agrees to lead them, hoping to minimize the possible violence. Gant, angered to see Luke backed by a mob, warns the men that if they shoot him, he will still live long enough to kill Luke, saloon owner Henry Reeger (another man afraid Gant is after him), Asa, Stricker, and several other town leaders. The men disband silently. Later, Luke confesses to Judge Benson that he likes Gant, and the judge warns him that Gant's viciousness is a progressive disease that he cannot cure.

In the store the next day, Gant approaches Anne and questions her about her home life, but he will not reveal his target. At the same time, the judge speculates to Luke that if the hunted man refused to defend himself, Gant could be legally arrested for murder, but Luke declares that no man could die without fighting. Soon after, Chaffee kills Stricker in a shootout, prompting Sheriff Hastings to take off his badge and drop it on the street. Anne, who has grown suspicious about her father the judge, reads a letter locked in his drawer that reveals a past crime. Realizing the likelihood that Gant has been hired to kill her father, she goes to Gant's room with a gun. Gant bluffs her that her gun is unloaded, and then easily takes it away from her. Anne declares that the judge will not defend himself, prompting Gant to rip off a piece of the upper part of her dress.

Gant goes to the judge's home and tells him that his "friends from back East send their respects". The old man admits his past guilt and tells Gant that he knows enough to send himself, the governor, and several other wealthy and powerful men to prison, but all they have to do is wait and nature will do Gant's job for him. Unfortunately, his old associates are impatient. Of course, the Judge refuses to fight. Gant then shows him the piece of Anne's dress and implies that he has raped her. The old judge is angered enough to grab a rifle and follow Gant outside. The old man has severe coughing and fires a wild shot before collapsing on the porch steps. Luke arrives and sees Gant with his gun drawn and assumes that Gant shot the old man. Luke starts to throw a hammer at him, but Gant shoots him in the right shoulder. As Gant is walking away toward his horse, Luke uses his left arm to throw a hammer. Just as Gant turns around, he is struck in the upper part of his gun arm and breaking it, so that Gant can no longer shoot. As Gant laboriously mounts his horse, Asa tells Luke that the old man was not shot. Luke offers to tend to his arm, but Gant replies, "Everything comes to a finish" and rides away.

Cast
 Audie Murphy as John Gant
 Charles Drake as Luke Canfield
 Joan Evans as Anne Benson
 Virginia Grey as Roseanne Fraden
 Warren Stevens as Lou Fraden
 R. G. Armstrong as Asa Canfield
 Willis Bouchey as Sheriff Buck Hastings
 Edgar Stehli as Judge Benson
 Simon Scott as Reeger
 Karl Swenson as Stricker
 Whit Bissell as Pierce
 Charles Watts as Sid
 John Alderson as Ben Chaffee
 Jerry Paris as Harold Miller
 Russ Bender as Storekeeper
 James Hyland as Hugo Molt (as Jim Hyland)

Reputation
The film has come to be regarded as one of Murphy's best movies, with its fans including director Joe Dante. Film writer Jeff Stafford stated that, "unlike most of Murphy's earlier Westerns, No Name on the Bullet has a philosophical edge, which makes it closer in tone to Ingmar Bergman's The Seventh Seal (1957) than a six-gun oater like Destry (1954)".

The film's title was used for a 1989 biography of Audie Murphy by Don Graham.

In 1969, Universal remade it as an episode of The Virginian entitled "Stopover", with singer/actor Herb Jeffries playing Murphy's character.

See also
 List of American films of 1959

References

External links

No Name on the Bullet at TCMDB

1959 films
1959 Western (genre) films
1950s English-language films
American Western (genre) films
Films directed by Jack Arnold
Universal Pictures films
Audie Murphy
Films scored by Herman Stein
Films set in Arizona
Revisionist Western (genre) films
1950s American films